"There is no alternative" (TINA) is a slogan strongly associated with the policies and persona of the Conservative British prime minister Margaret Thatcher.

In a speech to the Conservative Women's Conference on 21 May 1980, Thatcher appealed to the notion saying, "We have to get our production and our earnings into balance. There's no easy popularity in what we are proposing but it is fundamentally sound. Yet I believe people accept there's no real alternative." Later in the speech, she returned to the theme: "What's the alternative? To go on as we were before? All that leads to is higher spending. And that means more taxes, more borrowing, higher interest rates more inflation, more unemployment."

The slogan was often used by Thatcher.

The phrase is used to signify Thatcher's claim that the market economy is the best, right and only system that works, and that debate about this is over. One critic characterized the meaning of the slogan as: "Globalised capitalism, so called free markets and free trade were the best ways to build wealth, distribute services and grow a society's economy. Deregulation's good, if not God." By contrast, Thatcher described her support of markets as flowing from a more basic moral argument; specifically, she argued that the market-principle of choice flows from the moral principle that for human behavior to be moral requires free choice by people.

Historically, the phrase may be traced to its emphatic use by the 19th-century classical liberal thinker Herbert Spencer in his Social Statics. Opponents of the principle used it in a derisory manner. For instance, cabinet minister Norman St John-Stevas, one of the leading "wets", nicknamed Thatcher "Tina", after the acronym TINA. The critic of globalization Susan George coined the opposing slogan "another world is possible" in 2001.

Angela Merkel's use of the term  (literally "alternative-less"; without alternative) in relation to her responses to the European sovereign-debt crisis in 2010 led to the term becoming "un-word of the year".

In 2013, Prime Minister David Cameron resurrected the phrase, stating "If there was another way I would take it. But there is no alternative"—referring to austerity in the United Kingdom.

See also 
Capitalist Realism: Is There No Alternative? (2009 book)
Pensée unique
 Thatcherism

References

External links 
 
 
 

British political phrases
Margaret Thatcher
Capitalism
Economic liberalism
Herbert Spencer